Dichrorampha incognitana is a moth belonging to the family Tortricidae. The species was first described by Jerzy Kremky and Maslowski in 1933.

It is native to Europe.

References

Grapholitini